Education Otherwise (EO) is a registered charity based in England, which aims to provide support and information for families whose children are being educated outside school. It is the largest charity organisation in the United Kingdom. The organisation derived its name from the (then current) 1944 Education Act (Section 36), which stated that parents are responsible for the education of their children, "either by regular attendance at school or otherwise." This clause has been retained in subsequent Education Acts and remains a clear acceptance of the parity, and validity afforded an education,otherwise than by schooling.

Origins
In 1972, Royston Lambert, head of Dartington Hall School asked Dick Kitto, who had been working there since 1955, to set up a project in conjunction with Northcliffe School to provide education for a group of non-academic students who would have to take another year in school due to the pending raising of the school leaving age.  Kitto established a free school or democratic school model for the running of the project and was impressed by the qualities of the students even though they had effectively unschooled themselves within the school system, where they were perceived as trouble makers.

Kitto's school caught the attention of Stan Windass, who had been working for a children's rights centre in London, through which he had become aware of several families who were educating their own children. Windass asked Kitto to become the warden at Lower Shaw Farm, for which he had just taken the lease and wanted to establish it as a centre to explore ideas for an alternative society, after the Northcliffe School project ended.

Kitto was familiar with ideas about unschooled education through reading John Holt and Joy Baker's Children in Chancery (Hutchinson, 1964. now out of print), together with his experiences at the Northcliffe School project. He and Windass were able to contact several families who were educating otherwise and arranged an informal network and occasional meetings, in 1975 - 1976  which is when Education Otherwise began. One of the founding members was Iris Harrison, who was in the midst of a legal battle with her local authority because she was not sending her children to school.

During 1976, Granada Television made a World in Action programme about the group which resulted in around 200 enquiries and expanded the membership to over 50.  In September 1976 the group was established on a more formal basis. In 1977, Kitto presented a BBC TV Open Door programme about the ideas behind the organisation. This resulted in over 2,000 enquiries and increased the membership to around 250.

Kitto's ethos could be summarised as: 
"...we have to ensure that education is not monolithic, centralized and directed from above but allows all sorts of different things to happen and all sorts of initiatives to be taken by pupils, children, parents and education authorities."

The original logo (based on a UK traffic sign) was intended to represent a child breaking out of the confines of school, and pointing toward a different way. In recent years the logo has been the subject of criticism, as it is viewed as divisive and the meaning misconstrued. A modernisation and rebranding in 2020 has resulted in a new logo being designed through a design competition, which has a more modern and acceptable appearance.

Parent's Charter
In 1991, the government introduced a Parent's Charter (subtitled: "You and Your Child's Education"), which promised parents reports about their children and their schools. In 1994, a revised version of the Parent's Charter (subtitled: Our Children's Education) was issued.  Page 9 included the sentence: "You have a duty to make sure that your child goes to school until he or she is 16." Education Otherwise members were concerned that this misinformation should be corrected as it was being delivered to every household.

Education Otherwise appointed solicitor Peter Liell, who sent "Letters Before Action" notices to the Department for Education and to the Welsh Office. A reply by Eric Forth (9 July 1994) for the DfE claimed that the Parent's Charter could not be taken as a definitive guide to the law - the Charter "cannot take in every exception or reflect all points of detail". The department stated that there were no plans to issue a corrigendum. The Welsh Office response was a confirmation that the Charter for Parents in Wales had been revised and would reflect the fact that not all children were educated in schools.

The matter was raised by Don Foster in a Parliamentary Question, which was responded to by Robin Squire stating that John Patten, the Secretary of State for Education, saw no need to issue a correction or to make a statement about the mistake.
 
As English and Welsh education law are identical, there were no grounds for the variation in the responses of the two bodies. The solicitor notified the DfE that he had been instructed to prepare an application for leave to apply for judicial review of the decision as stated in Forth's letter. This threat caused an immediate response from the department that they "would want to find a different - in your eyes more satisfactory - wording for any further editions". The solicitor responded seeking confirmation, by 31 August 1994, that a future edition would include reference to the fact that children do not have to go to school. Forth once again responded accepting the need for a revised text: "I am, however, happy to confirm, in the light of your client's concerns, our intention that any future edition of the Parent's Charter in England will include a reference, be it explicit or implicit, to a parent's lawful right to ensure that his child is suitably educated otherwise than at school."

It was felt that this was as far as Education Otherwise could go with the matter and the application for judicial review was withdrawn. The whole process had cost Education Otherwise almost £4,000 but had generated a lot of publicity and raised awareness of the issue as many members had raised their concerns with their own MP.

See also 
Home education in the United Kingdom
Deschooling
Unschooling
John Holt
Leila Berg
Ivan Illich particularly his Deschooling Society
Schoolhouse - Charity covering Scotland
Autodidacticism
Holistic education
Homeschooling

Notes and references

External links
 Education Otherwise website
 Review of Children In Chancery

Child welfare activism
Alternative education
Philosophy of education
Homeschooling
Educational charities based in the United Kingdom